Marcia Anne Cross (born March 25, 1962) is an American actress. She acted in daytime soap operas such as The Edge of Night, Another World, and One Life to Live before moving to primetime television with a recurring role on Knots Landing. From 1992 to 1997, she starred as Kimberly Shaw on Melrose Place. Cross played the role of the housewife Bree Van de Kamp on the ABC television series Desperate Housewives (2004–12), for which she was nominated for three Golden Globe Awards for Best Actress in a Musical or Comedy, and a Primetime Emmy for Outstanding Lead Actress in a Comedy Series. She had a recurring role as President Claire Haas on the ABC series Quantico.

Early life
Cross was born in Marlborough, Massachusetts, and is of English and Irish descent. She is one of three daughters of Janet, a teacher, and Mark J Cross (1923–2021), a personnel manager. Cross was raised Catholic. She graduated from Marlborough High School in 1980 and received a half-scholarship to Juilliard. She completed college in 1984 earning a B.F.A. in Acting. Cross returned to school in 1997 receiving a master's degree in psychology from Antioch University Los Angeles in 2003.

Career
Cross began her television career in 1984 on the soap opera The Edge of Night, playing the recurring role of Liz Correll. Afterwards, she relocated from New York to Los Angeles, and soon landed roles in television movies such as The Last Days of Frank and Jesse James, co-starring with Johnny Cash and Kris Kristofferson. In 1986, she joined the cast of the ABC daytime soap opera One Life to Live, where she played the role of Kate Sanders, until 1987. She followed this with guest-starring roles on primetime shows such as Who's the Boss?, Quantum Leap, Knots Landing and Cheers.

In 1992, Cross was cast as Dr. Kimberly Shaw in the Fox primetime soap opera Melrose Place. She left in the fifth season. She also appeared on the episodes of sitcoms, such as Seinfeld, Boy Meets World, Ally McBeal, Spin City and The King of Queens. Her dramatic roles include appearances on CSI, Strong Medicine, Profiler and Touched by an Angel. Her film credits include independent movies Bad Influence (1990), Always Say Goodbye (1996), Just Peck (2009) and Bringing Up Bobby (2011). In 2003, Cross spent a season co-starring as Linda Abbott on WB's series Everwood.

In 2004, Cross starred as role of Bree Van de Kamp in Desperate Housewives. The show was the breakout hit of the 2004–05 television season, and Cross was nominated for several awards for her role, including an Emmy Award, three Golden Globe Awards, and five Screen Actors Guild Awards (winning two with cast). She also received a Satellite Award for her performance in the show's second season. The series ran for eight seasons until it concluded in 2012. In 2014, after two years on hiatus, Cross co-starred as the lead character's mother in the unsuccessful Fox comedy pilot Fatrick. In 2015, Cross guest starred in an episode of Law & Order: Special Victims Unit, and later joined the cast of ABC thriller series Quantico playing the recurring role of President Claire Haas, a former Democratic vice presidential nominee.

Personal life
As a child, Cross showed an early interest in performing. She took piano lessons, dance lessons at the Ceil Sharon School of Dance, and was her high school's mascot at school games. Her first acting role was in grade school, in a play called The Witch of Blackbird Pond.

Relationships 
Cross was the long-time companion of actor Richard Jordan, who was 25 years her senior; Jordan died from a brain tumor in 1993. In 2006, she married stockbroker Tom Mahoney. Cross underwent in vitro fertilization soon after their wedding, and gave birth to fraternal twin daughters in February 2007, shortly before her 45th birthday.

Activism 
In September 2018, Cross revealed she had been in remission for eight months after receiving treatment for anal cancer. She explained months later that she had decided to "put a dent in the stigma" because she had discovered through online research that anal cancer patients were embarrassed about their diagnosis. "I found myself in a position where nobody wants this job. Nobody wants to come forward. And I knew that people were suffering and people were ashamed," she said at the 2019 The Atlantic's People v. Cancer event. She advocates for open discussions and further public information about the HPV infection, which can cause cancers of the anus, cervix, ovary, penis, and throat: "In spite of the optics, I care deeply about saving lives. To that end, the important thing to do is educate the public about HPV."

Filmography

References

External links 

 
 
 
 

1962 births
Living people
Actresses from Massachusetts
American people of English descent
American people of Irish descent
American soap opera actresses
American television actresses
Antioch College alumni
Juilliard School alumni
People from Marlborough, Massachusetts
20th-century American actresses
21st-century American actresses